Keith Beirne (born 28 March 1997) is an Irish Gaelic footballer who plays for Mohill and at senior level for the Leitrim county team.

In an away game against Derry, Beirne scored nine points in the opening round of the 2020 National Football League (a game which ended in a draw), this after Leitrim had been promoted from Division 4 back to Division 3 for the first time in 12 years.

Beirne forced extra time against Sligo in the 2022 Tailteann Cup but Sligo won. In October, he was named on the Tailteann Cup Team of the Year, the only Leitrim player represented. He has played in the US as well.

The Beirne family from Mohill won the fifth season of Ireland's Fittest Family when Keith was 20.

Honours
Individual
 Tailteann Cup Team of the Year (1): 2022

References

Living people
Leitrim inter-county Gaelic footballers
Mohill Gaelic footballers
1997 births